Mama's Girl is a 2018 Philippine drama film directed by Connie Macatuno and written by Gina Marissa Tagasa. It stars Sofia Andres, Diego Loyzaga, Jameson Blake, Sylvia Sanchez,  Yana Asistio, Heaven Peralejo, Karen Reyes, Arlene Muhlach, Alora Sasam and Afi Africa, among others. It is produced by Regal Entertainment. It is about Abby, an ambitious millennial coming out into the world with the help of her single mother, Mina, an entrepreneur.

Cast
Main
 Sofia Andres as Abby Eduque, an ambitious 21-year-old millennial
 Diego Loyzaga as Nico Sanchez, Abby's childhood friend and an aspiring chef
 Jameson Blake as Zak Montañez, a rock star who is attracted to Abby
 Sylvia Sanchez as Mina Eduque, Abby's Gen X single mom
Secondary
 Yana Asistio as Rhea, one of Abby's best friends
 Heaven Peralejo as Diwa, another one of Abby's best friends
 Karen Reyes as MQ, also one of Abby's best friends
 Arlene Muhlach as Nelia, Mina's business partner and friend, and also Nico's mother
 Alora Sasam as Aleli, a waitress at Mama Mina's Pasta House
 Afi Africa as Vivo, a waiter at Mama Mina's Pasta House
 Lui Manansala as Loti, Abby's grandmother
 Allan Paule as Mario
 Eva Darren as Nenita
 Divine Aucina as Awra

Release 
The premiere night of Mama's Girl was on January 15, 2018 in Manila, Philippines. In line with the theme of the film, director Connie Macatuno and most of the cast who attended the event walked the red carpet with their mothers. It was released nationwide in many Philippine cinemas on January 17, 2018.

Critical response
Mama's Girl was graded 'A' by the Cinema Evaluation Board. Pablo Tariman of The Philippine Star praised Macatuno's directing, noting how she delivered "with simple storytelling that hit the emotional mark without fanfare" and also Sylvia Sanchez's performance as compared to her other roles as mother on TV. Rappler's Oggs Cruz wrote, "Mama's Girl is hardly a perfect film but its subtle but sincere impressions are worth the price of the ticket". He called to attention an apparent lack of influence of men on the main characters and their development, while comparing it to Macatuno's previous film Rome and Juliet, saying that it was "definitely softer" than its predecessor.

References

External links 
 
2018 drama films
Regal Entertainment films
Films about families
Philippine drama films